Gladys Knight is the self-titled second studio album by American singer Gladys Knight. It was released by Columbia Records in 1979 in the United States. Her only album with that label, it peaked at number 71 on the US Top R&B/Hip-Hop Albums chart. Gladys Knight would remain Knight's last solo album until the 1991 release of Good Woman.

Critical reception

Allmusic editor Alex Henderson wrote that Gladys Knight "isn't remarkable, but is a generally decent effort that ranges from R&B/adult contemporary ballads to up-tempo soul-disco offerings like "You Bring Out the Best in Me" and "You Don't Have to Say I Love You," both of which would appeal to a Loleatta Holloway or Thelma Houston fan [...] This LP, which she produced with Jack Gold, isn't recommended to casual listeners, who would be much better off with an anthology of her classic Motown and Buddah recordings with the Pips. But it's a likable record that is worth hearing if you're among Knight's hardcore fans."

Track listing 
All tracks produced by Jack Gold.

Charts

Release history

References 

Gladys Knight albums
1979 albums
Columbia Records albums